Bowling Green is a 1956 album by the Kossoy Sisters. The album consists of traditional folk songs. It features arrangements in a tight, two-part vocal harmony, with additional instrumental accompaniment by Erik Darling. In 2000, the third cut, "I'll Fly Away", was featured in the Coen Brothers film O Brother, Where Art Thou?, although the movie's best-selling, Grammy-winning soundtrack album used a different version. Another song from the Bowling Green album, the Kossoys' version of the Carter Family's "Single Girl, Married Girl", is heard on the soundtrack of the 2014 film Obvious Child. Originally released on Tradition Records, the album was re-released as a CD by Rykodisc in 1996.

Track listing

References

External links
 Discogs

1956 albums
Folk albums by American artists